Caught is a method of dismissing a batsman in the sport of cricket.

Caught may also refer to:
 Caught (Margaret Peterson Haddix novel), a novel by Margaret Peterson Haddix
 Caught (Coben novel), a 2010 novel by Harlan Coben
 Caught (1931 film), a 1931 American Pre-Code Western film
 Caught (1949 film), an American drama film
 Caught (1996 film), an erotic thriller film
 Caught (2015 film), an American psychological thriller film
 Caught (TV series), a 2018 Canadian crime drama television series
 Caught!, the fifth episode of The Bronx Is Burning
 Caught (album), a 1980 album by Teri DeSario
 "Caught", a 1988 song by Pseudo Echo from the album Race

See also
 Catch (disambiguation)
 Catching (disambiguation)
 Caught in the Middle (disambiguation)